The Cape Agulhas Local Municipality council consists of eleven members elected by mixed-member proportional representation. Six councillors are elected by first-past-the-post voting in six wards, while the remaining five are chosen from party lists so that the total number of party representatives is proportional to the number of votes received. In the election of 1 November 2021, the Democratic Alliance (DA) lost its majority, returning with a plurality of five seats.

Results 
The following table shows the composition of the council after past elections.

December 2000 election

The following table shows the results of the 2000 election.

March 2006 election

The following table shows the results of the 2006 election.

September 2007 floor crossing

In terms of the Eighth Amendment of the Constitution, in the period from 1–15 September 2007 councillors had the opportunity to cross the floor to a different political party without losing their seats. Floor-crossing was subsequently abolished in 2008 by the Fifteenth Amendment of the Constitution. In the Cape Agulhas council, one councillor crossed from the Democratic Alliance to the African National Congress.

By-elections from September 2007 to May 2011
The following by-elections were held to fill vacant ward seats in the period between the floor crossing period in September 2007 and the election in May 2011.

May 2011 election

The following table shows the results of the 2011 election.

By-elections from May 2011 to August 2016
The following by-elections were held to fill vacant ward seats in the period between the elections in May 2011 and August 2016.

August 2016 election

The following table shows the results of the 2016 election.

The local council sends two representatives to the council of the Overberg District Municipality: one from the Democratic Alliance and one from the African National Congress.

November 2021 election

The following table shows the results of the 2021 election.

By-elections from November 2021
The following by-elections were held to fill vacant ward seats in the period since the election in November 2021.

References

Cape Agulhas Local Municipality
Cape Agulhas
Elections in the Western Cape